Auchencastle railway station was a private station which served Auchencastle, near Beattock, in the Scottish county of Dumfries and Galloway. It was used by railwaymen and families and was served by local trains on what is now known as the West Coast Main Line. The nearest station for Auchencastle is now at Lockerbie.

History 
Opened by the Caledonian Railway, it became part of the London Midland and Scottish Railway during the Grouping of 1923 and was then closed by that company.

The site today 
Trains pass at speed on the electrified West Coast Main Line but there is no station at the site now.

References

Notes

Sources 
 
 
 
 Auchencastle station on navigable OS map

Disused railway stations in Dumfries and Galloway
Railway stations in Great Britain opened in 1900
Railway stations in Great Britain closed in 1926
Former Caledonian Railway stations
1900 establishments in Scotland
1926 disestablishments in Scotland
Private railway stations